Gakuen-mae Station may refer to:

Gakuen-mae Station (Chiba) - in Chiba Prefecture
Gakuen-mae Station (Hokkaido) - in Hokkaidō
Gakuen-mae Station (Nara) - in Nara Prefecture